Jacob Fidelis Ackermann (23 April 1765 – 28 October 1815) was a German professor of anatomy and surgery.

Ackermann was born in Rüdesheim am Rhein. He began his studies at Würzburg and earned his doctorate in Mainz in 1787. After extensive research travel he was promoted to private lecturer for forensic medicine in 1789. He acquired the regular professorship in botanics and later in anatomy when Samuel Thomas von Sömmering resigned his office.

In 1798 the university was dissolved. Ackermann became president and first professor of a newly founded special school of medicine. In 1804 he accepted a call as professor of anatomy and chirurgy at Jena, succeeding Justus Christian Loder. In the following year, he became professor of anatomy and physiology at Heidelberg.

In Heidelberg, Ackermann made himself a name as founder and developer of different institutes such as the Anatomical Theatre and the polyclinic.

At the end of the summer semester of 1815, Ackermann traveled to his small manor in the surroundings of Rüdesheim, as was his wont. There he fell ill with nephritis and died soon after.

Ackermann was described by his contemporaries as a very literate person, but also as a very corpulent one. Although he weighed 300 pounds (136 kg), he was said to be able to hop long distances on one leg while whistling cheerfully.

Apart from his publications, the city of Heidelberg conserves a special rarity from the hands of Jacob Ackermann: the dissected skeleton of rogue chieftain Schinderhannes, well known through the novels of Carl Zuckmayer.

Publications
 Über die Kreuzung der Sehnerven, Blumbach's medical bibliography, 1788, III. 307. 706.
 Gustus organi novissime detecti prodromus, Mainz, 1790
 Über den Cretinismus, Gotha, 1790
 Darstellung der Lebenskräfte, 2 volumes, Frankfurt am Main, 1797, 1800
 Über die Erleichterung schwerer Geburten, Jena, 1804
 Kritik an der Gall'schen Schädel- und Organlehre, Heidelberg, 1806
 De febribus epitome, Heidelberg, 1809
 Über die Natur des Gewächses, 1812
 Commentarii de nervei systematis primordiis, Mannheim, 1813

Sources
 Allgemeine Deutsche Biographie – online version

1765 births
1815 deaths
People from Rheingau-Taunus-Kreis
German anatomists
Members of the Prussian Academy of Sciences
University of Würzburg alumni
Johannes Gutenberg University Mainz alumni
Academic staff of Johannes Gutenberg University Mainz
Academic staff of the University of Jena
Academic staff of Heidelberg University
Deaths from nephritis